Khayelihle Shozi  is a South African footballer who plays as a midfielder or attacking midfielder for TS Galaxy.

Career
Shozi has graduated through the academy at Sundowns and began training with the first team under the direction of Pitso Mosimane and his technical team during the 2015/16 season.

The player was brought to Sundowns by Mabhuti Khenyeza, in 2010. Khenyeza was playing for the Chloorkop outfit at the time. The experienced Golden Arrows striker had Shozi playing for his own club, Rockers FC, before taking him to Sundowns.
The attacking midfielder is a talented player that has an eye for goal. He has been part of the SA U23 team under Owen da Gama.

References

Living people
South African soccer players
Place of birth missing (living people)
Association football midfielders
Mamelodi Sundowns F.C. players
SuperSport United F.C. players
Black Leopards F.C. players
Richards Bay F.C. players
TS Galaxy F.C. players
National First Division players
1994 births